Raouliopsis is a genus of South American plants in the tribe Gnaphalieae within the family Asteraceae.

 Species
 Raouliopsis pachymorpha (Wedd.) S.F.Blake - Venezuela, Colombia
 Raouliopsis seifrizii S.F.Blake - Magdalena region in Colombia

References

Gnaphalieae
Asteraceae genera
Flora of South America